Usuthu! The Battle Of Rorke's Drift 1879 is a board game published in 1989 by Valhalla Games.

Contents
Usuthu! is a game in which the Battle of Rorke's Drift is covered.

Reception
Charles H Vasey reviewed Usuthu! for Games International magazine, and gave it 3 stars out of 5, and stated that "Usuthu! is a reasonable blend of atmosphere and accuracy, but it is not a quick game. That said it is also not a thoughtless giant game where you work like fury to generate nothing very interesting."

Reviews
Fire & Movement #67

References

Board games introduced in 1989